The Bradford County Museum is a local history museum in Towanda, Bradford County, Pennsylvania. Located in the building which previously housed the Bradford County Jail, it is owned and operated by the Bradford County Historical Society, which has been in operation since 1870.

History
The museum offers two floors of exhibits in the former jail's cells related to county history from its early days to the present. Displays include early settler's household and farm equipment, area industry displays including coal mining and lumbering, medicine, glassware, transportation, textiles, a 1950s era jail cell and military objects.

The third floor features a genealogical and historical research library.

Programs
Museum staff and volunteers collaborate with other organizations across the region to assist the Towanda Area School District with the planning and implementation of its annual Summer Academy, which enables at-risk students within the school district in grades nine through twelve "to regain credits lost and/or to complete remaining graduation requirements." In 2019, the program's ninth year of operation, five out of seven students successfully completed the program, which is funded through the Educational Improvement Tax Credit that is sponsored by regional businesses including Citizens and Northern Bank, First Citizens Bank, and UPMC.

Location and hours of operation
The museum is located at 109 Pine Street in the center of downtown Towanda, Pennsylvania.

It is open between Memorial Day and Labor Day each year on Wednesdays, Thursdays and Fridays from 10 a.m. to 4 p.m., but is closed during the winter, except for specially-scheduled group tours.

References

External links
Bradford County Historical Society (website).
Bradford County Historical Society (Facebook page).

History museums in Pennsylvania
Museums in Bradford County, Pennsylvania
Prison museums in the United States
1998 establishments in Pennsylvania